Ctenucha circe is a moth of the family Erebidae. It was described by Pieter Cramer in 1780. It is found in Nicaragua, Ecuador, Venezuela and Brazil (Pará).

References

circe
Moths described in 1780